The Tuolumne County Arts Alliance is the official Tuolumne County, California, USA arts council.

The arts resources provide entertainment, enlightenment and objects of interest and beauty for homes, schools and businesses. And they contribute to the economy. The Tuolumne County Arts Alliance is a primary resource for arts in the County.

The Tuolumne County Arts Alliance runs under the California state arts council, the California Arts Council (CAC).

External links
Tuolumne County Arts Alliance website

Arts councils of California
Tuolumne County, California